The head of All Souls College, University of Oxford, is the Warden. The current Warden is Sir John Vickers who was elected in October 2008.

List of Wardens of All Souls College

References

 
All Souls Wardens
All Souls